William Edmondson "Grumble" Jones (May 9, 1824 – June 5, 1864) was a  Confederate cavalry general with a reputation for being a martinet to his troopers and fractious toward superiors, but acknowledged to be a good commander. After disagreements of a personal nature with J.E.B. Stuart, Jones's brigade was set to guarding supply lines and unavailable during a crucial juncture of the Gettysburg Campaign when Lee suffered from a lack of capable reconnaissance cavalry.  As the personality clash between Jones and Stuart escalated, Jones faced charges for impertinence, and was transferred to separate him from Stuart. Jones was killed leading a counter-attack in the 1864 Battle of Piedmont.

Early life
Jones was born in Washington County, Virginia. After graduating from Emory and Henry College in Virginia in 1844, he graduated from the United States Military Academy in 1848, ranking twelfth out of 48 cadets, and was commissioned a brevet second lieutenant in the U.S. Mounted Rifles. He served with the cavalry fighting Indians in the west and was promoted to first lieutenant in 1854. His nickname, "Grumble", reflects his irritable disposition. His wife was washed from his arms and drowned in a shipwreck shortly after their marriage in 1852 while en route to Texas. He resigned his commission in 1857, and became a farmer near Glade Spring, Virginia.

Civil War
At the start of the Civil War, Jones joined the 1st Virginia Cavalry Regiment as a captain, commanding a company he had raised. On May 9 he was promoted to major in Virginia's Provisional Army, and later that month both Jones and the regiment were transferred into the Confederate Army. Jones served under Col. J.E.B. Stuart in the First Battle of Bull Run in July 1861. The following month he was promoted to the rank of colonel and was given command of the 1st Virginia Cavalry. Regular officer Jones put his new volunteers through meticulous training and personally upbraided anyone who was slow to learn how to perform standard drills to their commander's exacting standards.

In the fall of 1861 the Confederate forces underwent a major reorganization, during which the enlisted men could elect their officers. Jones was not re-elected to his post as commander of the 1st Virginia Cavalry; losing to Fitzhugh Lee.

That October he was appointed to command the 7th Virginia Cavalry in the Shenandoah Valley, where he briefly replaced the ailing Angus W. McDonald, and led the regiment operating along the Potomac River during the early winter months of 1862. In March 1862 Jones was briefly given command of all cavalry in the Valley District, but was recalled to Richmond shortly before Jackson's Valley Campaign.

Returning to eastern Virginia, he was part of Stuart's ostentatious raid around Maj. Gen. George B. McClellan's army preceding the Seven Days battles. Jones was wounded in a skirmish at Orange Court House on August 2. His cavalry was distinguished in the Second Bull Run Campaign.

Jones had established himself a reputation as a "superb outpost officer"  but had already alienated Stuart.  Stuart expressed the opinion that Jones was the most difficult man in the army. Despite Stuart's protest, Lee  promoted Jones to brigadier general, and  assigned to him to command the 4th Brigade of Stuart's Cavalry Division in the Army of Northern Virginia. 

Jones was requested by Lt. Gen. Thomas J. "Stonewall" Jackson for the Valley District, and he took up the post on December 29, 1862.

In the spring of 1863, Jones and Brig. Gen. John D. Imboden raided the Baltimore and Ohio Railroad west of Cumberland, Maryland, destroying much of the railroad and public property in the area, including the Burning Springs Complex on May 9, 1863. Rejoining Stuart, he fought in the largest cavalry engagement of the war, the Battle of Brandy Station, June 9, 1863, at the start of the Gettysburg Campaign. He was surprised, as was all of Stuart's command, to be hit out of blue by Union cavalry under Maj. Gen. Alfred Pleasonton. Jones's brigade was outnumbered by the division of his West Point classmate, Brig. Gen. John Buford, but it held its own and ended the fight with more horses and more and better small-arms than at the beginning, capturing two regimental colors, an artillery battery, and about 250 prisoners.

Clashes with Jeb Stuart and Gettysburg
In one of the huge cavalry parades ordered by Stuart that had attracted the attention of Union forces and led to the Battle of Brandy Station, Jones put an affront on Stuart by disrupting a passing review ceremony for guest of honour Robert E. Lee.  Accustomed to good press, Stuart found himself criticised for ordering outrageous pageantry and then failing to maintain Confederate cavalry supremacy in a real battle. To make it worse, Stuart's bête noire Jones had been in the thick of the fighting and performed impressively at Brandy Station. By the beginning of the Gettysburg campaign, the function of cavalry was increasingly to be the eyes and ears of an army. John S. Mosby, once a protege of Jones, but now leading his own partisan ranger detachment, had given Stuart optimistic intelligence, which he seized on to propose a showy raid around the Union army. Lee had twice found similar cavalry probes by Stuart lasting a few days useful, and gave him discretionary orders for a new operation as part of the major offensive into the North.

Jones had so estranged Stuart that he chose to sideline the proven cavalry brigade commanded by Jones (and the similar one led by Beverly Robertson who had once been engaged to Stuart's wife) well away from the opportunity to distinguish themselves, either with Stuart or with Lee and the bulk of the army as it maneuvered in enemy territory. This left Lee with a couple of brigades of mounted partisan rangers, whom he distrusted for the vital work of probing enemy dispositions and screening the army from the enemy. Lee chose not to use the irregular brigades, and waited for the return of Stuart, but his sweep around the Union army took far longer than anticipated. Confederate blindness to the disposition and movements of Union forces during Stuart's eight day absence was a harbinger of insouciant reconnaissance that was widely thought to have been a major factor in Lee's tactics at the Battle of Gettysburg.

Battle of Fairfield
Before moving into Pennsylvania, General Robert E. Lee ordered Ewell to capture Harrisburg if practicable. On July 3, while Pickett's Charge was underway, the Union cavalry had had a unique opportunity to impede Lee's eventual retreat. Brig. Gen. Wesley Merritt's brigade departed from Emmitsburg with orders from cavalry commander Maj. Gen. Alfred Pleasonton to strike the Confederate right and rear along Seminary Ridge. Reacting to a report from a local civilian that there was a Confederate forage train near Fairfield, Merritt dispatched about 400 men in four squadrons from the 6th U.S. Cavalry under Major Samuel H. Starr to seize the wagons. Before they were able to reach the wagons, the 7th Virginia Cavalry, leading a column under Confederate Brig. Gen. William E. "Grumble" Jones, intercepted the regulars, starting the minor Battle of Fairfield. Taking cover behind a post-and rail fence, the U.S. cavalrymen opened fire and caused the Virginians to retreat. Jones sent in the 6th Virginia Cavalry, which successfully charged and swarmed over the Union troopers, wounding and capturing Starr. There were 242 Union casualties, primarily prisoners, and 44 casualties among the Confederates. Despite the relatively small scale of this action, its result was that the strategically important Fairfield Road to the South Mountain passes remained open. a few days later. The Battle of Culpeper Court House was Jones' last action under Stuart's command.

Stuart, who since Gettysburg had seen his reputation in the South and the Confederate army decline precipitously, court-martialed Jones for insulting him. Robert E. Lee was, by this time, aware of the personality clash and intervened to have Jones exonerated and transferred to the Trans-Allegheny Department in West Virginia. He recruited a brigade of cavalry there and campaigned in eastern Tennessee with Lt. Gen. James Longstreet's forces during the winter and spring of 1864.

Final campaign, death
In May, Jones assumed command of the Confederate forces in the Shenandoah Valley who were defending against the halting advance of Maj. Gen. David Hunter towards Lynchburg, Virginia, in the Valley Campaigns of 1864. In the Battle of Piedmont on June 5, 1864, Jones was shot in the head and killed while leading a charge against a superior attacking force.

Grumble Jones is buried in the Old Glade Spring Presbyterian Church graveyard, Glade Spring, Virginia. His fellow cavalry general, Brig. Gen. Imboden, wrote that Jones

In popular culture
The bluegrass band The Dixie Bee-Liners have a biographical ballad about Jones on their 2008 album Ripe (Pinecastle Records) entitled "Grumble Jones".  The song was co-written by band members Buddy Woodward, Brandi Hart, and Blue Highway guitarist Tim Stafford.

A street in Centreville, Virginia is named Grumble Jones Court.

See also

List of American Civil War Generals (Confederate)

Notes

References
 Eicher, John H., and David J. Eicher, Civil War High Commands. Stanford: Stanford University Press, 2001. .
 Lambert, Dobbie Edward. Grumble: The W. E. Jones Brigade of 1863–64. Wahiawa, HI: Lambert Enterprises, 1992.
 McClure, Alexander K., ed. The Annals of the Civil War Written by Leading Participants North and South. Philadelphia, PA: Times Publishing Company, 1879. . .
 Sifakis, Stewart. Who Was Who in the Civil War. New York: Facts On File, 1988. .
 Tagg, Larry. The Generals of Gettysburg . Campbell, CA: Savas Publishing, 1998. .
 Warner, Ezra J. Generals in Gray: Lives of the Confederate Commanders. Baton Rouge: Louisiana State University Press, 1959. .
"The Dixie Bee-Liners"
'maps.google.com Grumble Jones Ct. Centreville, VA 20121' Retrieved February 2, 2012.

Further reading
 Patchan, Scott C. The Battle of Piedmont and Hunter's Campaign for Staunton: The 1864 Shenandoah Campaign. Charleston: The History Press, 2011. .
 Wert, Jeffry D. Cavalryman of the Lost Cause: A Biography of J.E.B. Stuart. New York: Simon & Schuster, 2008. .

External links
Online biography

1824 births
1864 deaths
People from Washington County, Virginia
American people of Welsh descent
Confederate States Army brigadier generals
United States Army officers
United States Military Academy alumni
Emory and Henry College alumni
People of Virginia in the American Civil War
Confederate States of America military personnel killed in the American Civil War
Civil War near Cumberland, Maryland
American planters